Penrith is a market town and civil parish in the county of Cumbria, England, about  south of Carlisle. It is less than  outside the Lake District National Park, in between the Rivers Petteril and Eamont and just north of the River Lowther. It had a population of 15,181 at the 2011 census.

Historically in Cumberland, Penrith's current local authorities are the Eden District Council, which is based in the town, and Cumbria County Council. In 2023, Penrith will become part of the Westmorland and Furness unitary authority area. From 1974 to 2015, it was an unparished area with no local council. A civil parish was reintroduced as Penrith Town Council and first elected on 7 May 2015.

Toponymy

The etymology of "Penrith" has been debated. Several writers argue for the Cumbric or Welsh  "head, chief, end" (both noun and adjective) with the Cumbric , Welsh  "ford", to mean "chief ford", "hill ford", "ford end", or Whaley's suggestion: "the head of the ford" or "headland by the ford".

An alternative has been suggested consisting of the same  element meaning "head, end, top" + the equivalent of Welsh  "crimson". Research on the medieval spelling variants of Penrith also suggests this alternative etymology. The name "red hill" may refer to Beacon Hill, to the north-east of today's town. These names all reflect the local geology, as red sandstone is abundant in the area and was used for many buildings in Penrith.

Prehistory
The origins of Penrith go far back in time. There is archaeological evidence of "early, concentrated and continuous settlement" in the 
area. The Neolithic (c. 4500–2350 BCE) or early-Bronze Age (c. 2500–1000 BCE) sites at nearby Mayburgh Henge, King Arthur's Round Table, Little Round Table, Long Meg and Her Daughters, and Little Meg, and the stone circles at Leacet Hill and Oddendale are some of the visible traces of "one of the most important groups of prehistoric ritual sites in the region." In addition there have been various finds (stone axes, hammers, knives) and carvings found in the Penrith area.

For the Celtic (Iron Age) era (c. 800 BCE – 100 CE), nearby Clifton Dykes has been proposed as the centre of the Carvetti tribe, due to the large enclosure discovered there and assumptions about the strategic position of the Penrith area in the communications systems running north–south through the Eden Valley and east–west across Stainmore.

Roman period

Penrith itself was not established by the Romans, but they recognised the strategic importance of the place, especially near the confluence of the rivers Eamont and Lowther, where the Roman road crossing the Pennines (the present A66) came through. In doing so, they built the fort at Brougham (Brocavum) along with another road (the present A6) going north over Beacon Hill to the large fort at Plumpton (Voreda) – and from there northwards to Carlisle (Luguvallium). Brocavum may also have been built in order to have a military presence close to the centre of the Carvetti.

The Roman fort of Voreda occupied the site now known as Old Penrith, five miles north of the town. The 18th-century antiquarian and vicar of Penrith, Dr.Hugh Todd, speculated that the Ala I Petriana may have been stationed there, giving its name to the subsequent town, but see the "Toponymy" section above.

The Roman road from Manchester to Carlisle ran through the area. Excavations before an extension to Penrith Cemetery showed the road had survived better at the edges of the field. The cobble and gravel surfaces seemed to have been ploughed out at the centre. The road was constructed by excavating a wide, shallow trench below subsoil level. Large cobbles were probably obtained nearby, as they did not appear frequently in the subsoil in the excavated area. They were added to the excavated subsoil dumped back into the cut to form a stable foundation, canted at the centre of the road.

Both the forts near the future Penrith would have had a vicus, an ad-hoc civilian settlement nearby, where farmers supplying food to the forts, and traders and others supplying goods and services lived and died. There is evidence of continuous settlement throughout the Roman period and into the post-Roman era.

History
Penrith's history has been defined primarily by its strategic position on vital north–south and east–west communications routes. This was especially important in its early history, when Anglo-Scottish relations were fraught. Furthermore, Penrith was a Crown possession in its early phase, though often granted to favoured noble families. It did not become a chartered borough or a municipal corporation and had no representation in Parliament. It also gained growth from its proximity to the Inglewood Forest and to the fertile Eden valley, and largely depended upon agriculture, especially cattle rearing and droving.

Early medieval period
After the departure of the Romans (c. 450 CE), the north became a patchwork of warring Celtic tribes (Hen Ogledd). One of these may have been Rheged, perhaps with a centre in the Eden valley and covering the area formerly held by the Carvetti. However, this has been disputed by historians. The Rheged Centre, just outside Penrith, commemorates the name.

During the 7th century, the region was invaded by the Angles, a Germanic tribe which moved west from Northumbria. The Celtic place-names in the region such as Penrith, Blencow, Culgaith, Penruddock, were now joined by settlements ending in "-ham" (estate) and "-ton" (farm), such as Askham, Barton, Clifton, Plumpton and Stainton.

From about 870, the area became subject to Viking settlement by Norse from Dublin and the Hebrides, along with Danes from Yorkshire. Settlements with names ending in "-by" ("village") and "-thorpe" ("hamlet") were largely on higher ground – the Vikings were pastoralists, the Angles arable farmers. Examples are Melkinthorpe, Langwathby, Lazonby, and Ousby. Little and Great Dockray in Penrith itself are Norse names.

The Penrith Hoard of Viking silver brooches was found in the Eden valley at Flusco Pike, Penrith, as were 253 pieces of silver at Lupton. 

Two cross-shafts and four hogbacks, along with a small cross found immediately to the west of St Andrew's Church, known as the "Giant's Grave" and "Giant's Thumb" (c. 920s), have long prompted speculation. They may have been separate items brought together by an antiquary or they may be a genuine group. They appear to be an Anglo-Norse fusion of Christian and Norse motifs, but it is still debated whether they are linked to the King of the Strathclyde Cumbrians, Owain ap Dyfnwal (fl. 934). It is thought that Strathclyde British had settled in parts of north Cumbria in the 10th century.

On 12 July 927, Eamont Bridge (or possibly the monastery at Dacre, Cumbria, or the site of the old Roman fort at Brougham or even the church at Penrith, or a combination of these) was the scene of a gathering of kings from throughout Britain as recorded in the Anglo-Saxon Chronicle and the histories of William of Malmesbury and John of Worcester. Present were Athelstan, King of the Anglo-Saxons and then of the English, Constantín mac Áeda (Constantine II), King of Scots, Owain of Strathclyde, King of the Cumbrians, Hywel Dda, King of Wales, and Ealdred son of Eadulf, Lord of Bamburgh. Athelstan took the submission of some of these other kings, presumably to form some sort of coalition against the Vikings. The growing power of the Scots and perhaps of the Strathclyders, may have persuaded Athelstan to move north and attempt to define the boundaries of the various kingdoms. This is generally taken as the date of foundation of the Kingdom of England, whose northern boundary was the Eamont river, with Westmorland outside the control of Strathclyde. Penrith was effectively held by the Scottish king as overlord of the Strathclyde Cumbrians, until the Norman takeover in 1092. Thereafter Penrith's fortunes varied according to the state of play between England and Scotland over ownership of Cumberland, Westmorland and Northumbria.

Penrith may have been founded before the arrival of the Normans. A ditched oval enclosure surrounding the area now occupied by St Andrew's Church (a burh - hence "Burrowgate") has been excavated. A church on the site may date back to the time of Bishop Wilfrid, (c. 670s) whose patron saint was Saint Andrew.

Later medieval period: Normans and Plantagenets
The Norman conquest of north Cumbria took place in 1092 under William Rufus, who retained Carlisle, Penrith and some other manors round Penrith as demesne. The Norman and Plantagenet rulers thereafter held Penrith as a crown estate ("Penred Regis"), along with a group of others locally, including Carlatton, Castle Sowerby, Gamblesby, Glassonby, Langwathby, Great Salkeld, Little Salkeld and Scotby. The group became known as the "Queen's Hames" ("Queen's Homes") from 1330 onwards.

Membership of the group fluctuated over time. In 1187 a sub-set including Penrith, Langwathby, Great Salkeld, Gamblesby, Glassonby and Scotby was referred to as the Honour of Penrith. From 1242 to 1295, the Honour of Penrith (created "the liberty of Penrith" by the Treaty of York in 1237) was in the hands of the King of Scots, in return for renouncing his claims to Northumberland, Cumberland and Westmorland. King Henry III had been reluctant to cede Penrith to the Scots, as it was a good source of Crown income: the right to hold a market and fair was granted in 1223 by Henry, and arable farming produced good yields and taxes. Tensions between the English Crown's agents in Cumberland and the Scottish agents attempting to defend the rights of the Scottish king and his tenants in the liberty of Penrith, may have influenced the mindset of the Scots leading up to the outbreak of the Wars of Scottish Independence.

King Edward I took Penrith and the other manors back into Crown possession (having been taken from the Scots and given to Bishop Anthony Bek). Perhaps to underline the authority of the Crown, Edward also established an Augustinian Friary in 1291. This succumbed to the Reformation in 1539. The Friarage house was built on the site in 1717.

With the Wars of Scottish Independence, Penrith suffered destruction by Scottish forces in 1296 (William Wallace), 1314, 1315–1316 and 1322 (Robert the Bruce). Meanwhile climatic change caused poor harvests. Penrith went from incipient economic growth in the early 14th century to poverty by the third decade. Recovery in the 1330s was again reversed by the devastating Scottish raid of 1345 (David II of Scotland) and the Black Death of 1348–1349 and subsequent years. However, Penrith, Castle Sowerby and the other manors were valuable as a source of royal income, paying debts the Crown owed to those leading the fight against the Scots, such as Roger de Leybourne, Anthony de Lucy and Andrew Harclay, 1st Earl of Carlisle.

There is evidence of a protective wall built round the town after the Scottish raid of 1345. This was strengthened in 1391 by the townspeople and Penrith's patron, William Strickland, Bishop of Carlisle, after another Scottish raid by the 1st Earl of Douglas in 1380, and others in 1383 and 1388, when Brougham Castle was probably destroyed as well. It is thought that Strickland built and strengthened the "pele tower" in Benson Row, behind Hutton Hall. He also endowed a chantry (1395) in St Andrew's Church, (where the chantry priest may have taught music and grammar), and created Thacka Beck, diverting clean water from the River Petteril, which was notably valuable for the tanning and related industries.

Strickland shared power in Penrith with the Neville family, which had been promoted in the North by Richard II of England to offset the influence of the Percies. In 1396, Ralph Neville, 1st Earl of Westmorland and his wife Joan gained the manors of Penrith and Castle Sowerby: windows in St Andrew's Church may depict the Nevilles along with Richard II. Ralph probably started building Penrith Castle, which was continued by his son, Richard Neville, 5th Earl of Salisbury, father of Richard Neville, 16th Earl of Warwick, the "Kingmaker", whose death in the Battle of Barnet in 1471 led Edward IV of England to grant the Castle and Penrith manors to Richard of Gloucester, the future Richard III, to keep them Yorkist. Richard III used Penrith as a base against the Scots and to promote a Yorkist "affinity" in the area to offset Lancastrian loyalties at nearby Brougham, Appleby (Clifford) and Greystoke (Baron Greystoke) and elsewhere. Tradition has Richard staying in what is now Dockray Hall (once the Gloucester Arms) during building work on the castle. The latter was more of a palace than a military stronghold, with a chantry chapel endowed by Richard.

Early modern period (1485–1714)

Tudor period
The Tudor period saw the centralising tendencies of the Yorkist government continued. The English Reformation, economic and social progress, educational change, the rise of the non-noble landed gentry and the depredations of the plague all affected Tudor England, and Penrith was no exception.

The eclipse of the Nevilles and Percies by the end of the Wars of the Roses opened the field for families such as the Cliffords, the Dacres and the Musgraves to jostle for position in the North (including those of the Sheriff of Cumberland, the Warden of the West March and the keeper of Penrith Castle).

Penrith people were involved in a rebellion of 1536/1537 known as the Pilgrimage of Grace. Eight town residents were executed as a result. The motives seem to have been partly religious, partly to do with a desire for more English government protection against Scottish raids.

The reformation went on apace afterwards – the Augustinian Priory was dissolved and the two chantry bequests closed later. The Strickland bequest partly funded the Penrith Grammar School, founded 1564, in the reign of Elizabeth I. Many governors of the new foundation in St Andrew's churchyard were rising Protestant gentry, who moved into various houses in Penrith: the families of Whelpdale (whose coat of arms adorns Dockray Hall), Carleton, Bost and Hutton (who had taken over the pele tower in Benson Row), and Richard Dudley of Yanwath Hall. The foundation was overseen by Sir Thomas Smith, one of Elizabeth's trusted Protestant counsellors.

Penrith was not involved in the Rising of the North in 1569, despite involvement by Sir Richard Lowther and his younger brother Gerard, whose house in Penrith became the former Two Lions Inn. The merchant, Robert Bartram, may have built the Tudor House in St Andrew's Place (1563), indicating a trading class operating in Penrith.

However, there may have been a substantial underclass as well, as shown by possible poverty and poor nutrition causing a high death rate in 1587, when there may have been a typhus epidemic. The Bubonic plague may have caused some 615 deaths in 1597–1598, according to the vicar's register (2,260 according to a brass plaque inside St Andrew's Church).

Stuart period
Penrith in Stuart times was affected by political and religious upheavals that saw the English Civil War, the Commonwealth and the Glorious Revolution, but was spared any fighting. It also escaped the witch-craze phenomenon that afflicted other parts of England. The Union of the Crowns and suppression of the reiver clans such as the Grahams, gave Penrith relief from Scottish raiding and a boost to Penrith's commercial prosperity. James VI and I and his entourage of 800 visited Brougham Castle in 1617, which boosted commerce. However, Penrith's crossroads position on the north–south and east–west routes made it vulnerable to starving vagrants bringing disease. This plus a national food shortage may have led to a typhus epidemic in 1623.

During the Civil War, Penrith's gentry were mostly Royalist, but Penrithians seem to have been neither for nor against the King. During the first war (1642–1646), General Leslie took over Brougham Castle for the Covenanters and Penrith became a supply centre for Parliament. In the second civil war starting in 1648, Brougham and Penrith castles were strategic assets. Major-General Lambert, the Parliamentary commander, took over Penrith in June 1648 until forced out by Scottish royalists aided by Sir Philip Musgrave of Edenhall. The Covenanters supported the future Charles II after 1648. He stayed at Carleton Hall in 1651 on his way south to defeat at the Battle of Worcester.

Because Penrith lacked borough or corporation status, governance fell on the local nobility, gentry and clergy, (such as Hugh Todd). During the Commonwealth, Presbyterian "Godly rule" was administered at St Andrew's Church by the local Justice of the peace, Thomas Langhorne, who had bought Lowther's Newhall/Two Lions house. Meanwhile, Penrith benefited from work on restoration of Brougham and other castles, and by charitable donations undertaken by Lady Anne Clifford. The gradual rise in religious toleration eventually saw in 1699 the establishment, by the Quakers, of Penrith's second place of worship, the Friends' Meeting House in Meeting House Lane.

Leading gentry of Cumberland and Westmorland gathered at the George Inn on 4 January 1688 at the behest of Lord Preston, the Lord Lieutenant of Cumberland and Westmorland. He was attempting to gauge the views of leading figures in the counties (deputy-lieutenants, and J.P.s) on the intention of King James II to introduce greater religious toleration. Partly due to efforts by John Lowther, 1st Viscount Lonsdale, the attendees were persuaded to give a non-committal reply. The Whig Lowther went on to contribute to securing the two counties for King William in the Glorious Revolution and advancing his career, unlike his local (Tory) rival Christopher Musgrave of Edenhall who had been more dilatory in his support for William. This exemplified local politics feeding into national politics.

The economy of Penrith "continued to rely on cattle rearing, slaughtering and the processing of cattle products" (leather goods, tanning, shoemaking).

Local government before 1974

Penrith was an urban district from 1894 to 1974, when it merged into Eden District. It was coterminous with the civil parish of Penrith, although when the council was abolished, Penrith became an unparished area. The area had been an urban sanitary district presided over by a Local Board of Health. The district also contained the hamlets of Carleton (now a suburb of Penrith), Bowscar, Plumpton Head and some of the village of Eamont Bridge. It was split into four wards – North, South, East and West – which remained the basic local-government divisions in the town until the 1990s.

In the 1920s Penrith Castle came into council possession, its grounds becoming a public park. Castle Hill (Tyne Close) Housing Estate was built nearby. Further council housing was built at Fair Hill and Castletown before the Second World War, and after the war at Scaws, Townhead and Pategill. The district was bordered on three sides by Penrith Rural District, the southern boundary marked by the River Eamont being with Westmorland.

Governance

UK Parliament
Penrith is in the parliamentary constituency of Penrith and the Border.  Its Member of Parliament (MP) is Neil Hudson (Conservative), who was elected at the 2019 General Election, with a majority of 37.8 per cent, replacing Rory Stewart.

Local government
Penrith has three levels of local government – county, district and parish (town). For county purposes it is governed by Cumbria County Council, whose social services and education departments used to have area offices in the town. It remains the seat of administration for Eden District Council, one of the largest districts by area in England and the most sparsely populated. It is based at offices in Penrith Town Hall and at the building now known as Mansion House, formerly Bishop Yards House.

A civil parish of Penrith was first formed in 1866. Between 1894 and 1974 the Urban District council acted as the parish council, but on its abolition, its successor authority, Eden District Council, decided that Penrith would become an unparished area under the district council's direct control. In 2014 a referendum was held open to all registered voters in the unparished area of Penrith to see if they wanted a parish council for Penrith, and the result was in favour. The first elections to this were held on 7 May 2015. Initially the town council was based in offices in St Andrews Place, but since 2017 it has taken the former county council offices in Friargate.

Local government divisions
For electing councillors to Eden District Council and to Penrith Town Council, the civil parish of Penrith is divided into six wards:
Penrith West: Castletown and parts of the town centre and Townhead
Penrith North: part of the town centre, the New Streets, most of Townhead and the outlying settlements of Roundthorn, Bowscar and Plumpton Head
Penrith South: Wetheriggs, Castle Hill, a small part of the town centre, part of Eamont Bridge and part of the Bridge Lane/Victoria Road area
Penrith East: part of the town centre, Scaws, Carleton Parklands and Barco
Penrith Carleton (formerly part of Penrith East): Carleton Village, High Carleton, Carleton Heights, Carleton Hall Gardens
Penrith Pategill (formerly part of Penrith East): Pategill, Carleton Drive/Place, Tynefield Drive/Court and part of Eamont Bridge

Penrith West and South wards make up the Penrith West Electoral Division of Cumbria County Council, while East, Carleton and Pategill wards combine as Penrith East division. Penrith North, along with the rural Lazonby ward, makes up Penrith North division.

2023 changes to Local Government
In 2023 Cumbria County Council and the 6 District councils within the county will be abolished and replaced by 2 new unitary authorities. Eden along with South Lakeland and the Borough of Barrow-in-Furness will become the new unitary District of Westmorland and Furness.  The first elections to the new authority will take place in May 2022.  Penrith has been divided into 2 new wards for the new council- Penrith North (the current Eden council wards of Penrith North and East) and Penrith South (the current West, South, Carleton and Pategill wards).

Geography

Watercourses
Penrith lies in the Eden Valley, just north of the River Eamont. Other local rivers bounding the town are the Lowther and Petteril. Thacka Beck flows through the town centre partly in a culvert, remaining mostly underground. It links the River Petteril and the River Eamont. For many centuries, the Beck provided Penrith's main water supply. Thacka Beck Nature Reserve provides flood storage to protect buildings in Penrith. Another stream, the Myers or Dog Beck, flows through and under the south-west of the town, joining Thacka Beck near Tynefield Court. The Dog Beck section has also been known as Scumscaw Beck or Tyne Syke. In 2014 the pub chain Wetherspoons opened a branch in Penrith, naming it the Dog Beck. There are also streams or becks running through the Carleton area of the town.

Divisions and suburbs

Castletown
Castletown, west of the West Coast Main Line, includes the Gilwilly Industrial Estate and some of the Penrith or Myers Industrial Estate. The area, originally built for workers on the railway line, mostly consists of late 19th and early 20th-century terraced housing, including some council housing. Since the 1990s, private developments such as Greystoke Park, Castletown Drive and Castle Park have appeared.

There was until March 2010 a pub in the suburb, The Castle Inn, and in previous years a sub-post office, a Co-op store and other shops, all now closed. Until the 1970s, Castletown had its Church of England St Saviour's in Brougham Street, acting as a chapel of ease to Penrith's parish church of St Andrew, originally built as a Primitive Methodist chapel. As of 2017, the Oasis Evangelical Church holds services at Brackenber Court sheltered housing complex in Musgrave Street. The Church in the Barn, Elim Pentecostal church, meets at the community centre at Gilwilly.

The suburb has a community centre on the recreation ground at Gilwilly and until recently held an annual gala day and parade throughout Penrith. At one time in the mid-20th century elections were held amongst regulars at the Castle pub to find a Mayor of Castletown. There is longstanding rivalry between the Castletown and Townhead districts.

Townhead
Townhead is the town's northern area, including the Fair Hill district and the Voreda Park or Anchor housing estate. It mainly flanks the A6 road, heading uphill towards Carlisle. The road is named Stricklandgate and Scotland Road, but on maps before the mid-19th century it appears as Town Head. It was one of seven constablewicks into which the ancient Penrith parish divided, alongside Middlegate, Burrowgate, Dockray and Netherend in the town proper and Plumpton Head and Carleton beyond.

New Streets

New Streets marks an area between Townhead and Scaws on the side of the Beacon Hill or Fell, with steep streets of some terraced housing, but mainly detached and semi-detached houses of the late 19th century. These streets from north to south are Graham, Wordsworth, Lowther and Arthur Street. The term sometimes includes Fell Lane, which is actually the ancient east road from Penrith town centre to Langwathby), and Croft Avenue and Croft Terrace (from about 1930), which were not developed till later. At the foot is Drovers Lane, once Back Lane, subdivided into Drovers Terrace, Wordsworth Terrace, Lowther Terrace, Bath Terrace, Arthur Terrace, Lonsdale Terrace, and finally Meeting House Lane. Along the top is Beacon Edge, with extensive views over the town and towards the Lake District. Until the turn of the 20th century, Beacon Edge was known as Beacon Road. Apart from the streets up the fellside there are some that link smaller housing developments between them.

The fellside is known to have been used as a burial ground for victims of bubonic plague, which struck Penrith down the centuries. There are also areas that still have farming names, such as a wooded enclosure in Fell Lane known as the Pinfold (or Pinny) – once a pound for stray animals until owners paid to reclaim them. One lane off Beacon Edge is still Intack Lane, i. e. the lane to farmed land. Most of what formed the intack was passed to Penrith Cemetery.

Scaws
The Scaws Estate was built by Penrith Urban District Council after World War II on land hitherto known as the Flatt Field and Scaws Farm, as part of the Lowther Estates. Scaws Farm is now Coldsprings Farm, the name being changed after a murder there. Later some private housing was built on higher parts of the estate.

Beaconside Primary School stands in the centre of the estate, where there were once three corner shops and a launderette. Adjoining Scaws are the private Barcohill and Meadow Croft housing estates.

Carleton

Carleton was once a separate settlement of houses along one side of the A686 road following the boundary of the built-up area. Carleton Hall holds the headquarters of the Cumbria Constabulary. The area is the home of Carelton Banks FC, colloquially the Pinks.

Pategill
Adjoining Carleton is the Pategill Housing Estate. It began as a council estate on land once part of the Carleton Hall estate and is still mostly owned by housing associations. Two streets, Prince Charles Close and Jubilee Close, were opened by the Prince of Wales in 1977. The centre of the estate is accessible by foot only and there was until 2012 a small convenience store. Several properties are run as sheltered housing for the elderly.

Wetheriggs
The Wetheriggs, Skirsgill and Castle Hill or Tyne Close areas were developed in the 1920s by Penrith Urban District Council on land formerly known as Scumscaw. The first private housing was developed in Holme Riggs Avenue and Skirsgill Gardens just before World War II. Further development did not start until the 1960s and 1970s, on land between Wetheriggs Lane and Ullswater Road. Not until the late 1980s were the two roads connected by the Clifford Road extension, which saw the Skirsgill area developed. There are three schools: Ullswater Community College. North Lakes Junior and Queen Elizabeth Grammar School (QEGS). The Crescent in Clifford Road holds sheltered accommodation for the elderly. There was once a shop at the junction of Huntley Avenue and Clifford Road and another at the foot of Holme Riggs Avenue. The large North Lakes Hotel and Spa stands at the junction of Clifford and Ullswater Roads, overlooking the Skirsgill Junction 40 Interchange of the M6 motorway, A66 and A592 roads.

Penrith New Squares
Plans to expand Penrith town centre south into the Southend Road area began by expanding the swimming pool area into a leisure centre, to replace a previous car park and sports fields, including ones used by Penrith and Penrith United football clubs. Plans for the rest of the scheme were drawn up by a property firm and included a supermarket and shopping streets, car parking and housing. Penrith New Squares refers to shops to be centred round two squares for parking and public entertainment.

Work here was suspended in October 2008 due to the financial crisis, but a new deal was agreed with Sainsbury's and it resumed in 2011. The update includes less new housing, with parts deferred for up to five years. Sainsburys opened in December 2011. In June 2013, the first shop in the squares opened, along with a walk through from Sainsburys to the town centre.

Landmarks

The main church is St Andrew's, built in 1720–1722 in an imposing Grecian style, abutting a 13th-century tower. The churchyard has ancient crosses and hogback tombstones known as the Giant's Grave (early 10th century) and Giant's Thumb (remains of a Norse cross from about 920).

Ruins of Penrith Castle (14th–16th centuries) can be seen from the adjacent railway station. It is run by English Heritage. To the south-east of the town are more substantial ruins of Brougham Castle, also held by English Heritage, as are the ancient henge sites known as Mayburgh Henge and King Arthur's Round Table to the south.

The town centre has a Clock Tower erected in 1861 to mark Philip Musgrave of Edenhall. Hutton Hall in Friargate has a 14th-century pele tower at the rear, attached to an 18th-century building. Dockray Hall (once the Gloucester Arms) dates from about 1470 and may include remains of another pele tower. Richard, Duke of Gloucester resided there before becoming King Richard III and carried out extensive work at Penrith Castle about 1471.

Penrith has many wells. Well-dressing ceremonies took place on days in May. Three miles south-east, on the River Eamont opposite Ninekirks, are the "Giants' Caves", with a well dedicated to St Ninian. These are enlarged out of Lower Permian sandstone and their associated breccias and purple shales.

Just north of the town is a wooded signal-beacon hill named Beacon Hill, originally Penrith Fell. Its last use was probably in 1804 in the war against Napoleon. Traditionally, Beacon Pike warned of danger from Scotland. Though ringed by commercial woodland owned by Lowther Estates, it still has natural woodlands visited by locals and tourists. On a clear day most of Eden Valley, local fells, Pennines and parts of the North Lakes can be seen. Beacon Hill possibly gave Penrith its Celtic name of "red hill".

A fibreglass -tall statue of King Kong once stood in the Skirsgill Auction Mart.

Transport
Just off Junction 40 of the M6 motorway, the A66, A6 and A686 intersect in the town.

Penrith is a stop on the West Coast Main Line, with the station, dating from 1846, officially known as Penrith North Lakes. Since an upgrade to the West Coast Main Line was completed in 2008, fewer trains have stopped, leaving a less regular service to London, Birmingham, Manchester, Glasgow and Edinburgh.

National Express operate two long-distance coach routes with stops in Penrith.

The National Cycle Network's major National Route 7 runs through the town, and National Route 71 stops just short of its southern edge.

Penrith has taxi firms licensed by Eden District Council. The main rank is in Sandgate in the middle of town, near the bus station. There is another outside the railway station.

Local buses are run mostly by Stagecoach in Cumbria, with links to Carlisle, Keswick and West Cumbria, Ullswater and less frequent ones to Windermere, Appleby-in-Westmorland and Kendal. There is also a 646 town service run by the local NBM Motors, serving most of the town once an hour. Fellrunner buses connect Penrith to villages in the Eden Valley. A daily service to Alston and Newcastle-upon-Tyne is run by Wright Brothers of Nenthead. The bus station is in the town centre off Sandgate. Many services also stop at the railway station.

Public services

Health
Penrith Hospital and Health Centre lies along Bridge Lane at the southern entrance to the town, close to the Kemplay Bank roundabout, where the A6, A66 and A686 meet. These are administered by the Cumbria Partnership NHS Trust. It opened in 1970 to replace Jubilee Cottage Hospital on Beacon Edge, Fairhill Fever Hospital and the maternity home at the old workhouse in Castletown. It has wards for the elderly, mental health care and minor injuries, and a Primary Care Assessment unit, a maternity wing and the Lady Anne Clifford Day Hospital. Various weekly clinics are held at the hospital and the adjacent health centre, which opened in 1983 and brought all three NHS medical practices into one building – two have since merged. There is also a pharmacy in the centre.

There are several private and National Health Service dental practices in the town.

Police and fire
Penrith falls comes under Cumbria Constabulary, with headquarters at Carleton Hall on the outskirts of the town. The town's own police station was in Hunter Lane, but has since been replaced by a smaller one close to Carleton Hall. Carleton Hall also houses Penrith's fire station and the headquarters of Cumbria Fire and Rescue Service.

Ambulance
The North West Ambulance Service has a base in Tynefield Drive, close to the hospital. The Great North Air Ambulance Service has its Cumbrian base close to Penrith at Langwathby and was at one time-based at Carleton Hall. The Penrith Mountain Rescue team, whose operating area covers the Eden Valley, North Pennines and the area towards the Scottish border, also has a base in Tynefield Drive.

Notable people

In order of birth:
Richard III (1452–1485) lived at Penrith Castle for a time. The links to him in the town include two fragments of medieval glass. One in St Andrew's Church is taken to show the heads of Richard Plantagenet and Cecily Neville – Richard III's parents. The other, on display in the town, shows the Musgrave coat of arms. Richard III is thought to have stayed at the Gloucester Arms, then a large private house. The bar has panelling of various periods, behind which is an early screen carved with a design taken to be broom (Planta genista), an emblem of the Plantagenet kings.
The Scottish road-builder and engineer John Loudon Macadam (1756–1836), inventor of macadamized roads, lived for a while at Cockell House in Townhead. Close by are streets named Macadam Way and Macadam Gardens.
George Leo Haydock (1774–1849), noted for an annotated edition of the Catholic Douay Bible, served as Catholic priest here from 1839 until his death in 1849.
Penrith was the home town of the mother of the poet William Wordsworth (1770–1850). He spent some of his childhood there, attending school with Mary Hutchinson, his later wife.
The Victorian writer Frances Trollope (1779–1863), Anthony Trollope's mother, lived for a while at a house called Carleton Hill (not Carleton Hall) outside the town on the Alston road.
Samuel Plimsoll (1824–1898), MP and social reformer, spent some of his childhood at Page Hall in Foster Street. The houses at Townhead called Plimsoll Close are named after him.
Percy Toplis (1896–1920), the "monocled mutineer", was shot and killed on the run by police at Plumpton, near Penrith. He is buried in Penrith's Beacon Edge Cemetery in an unmarked grave. His monocle is on display in Penrith and Eden Museum.
Mary (1916–2018), wife of Prime Minister Harold Wilson, lived in Penrith whilst her father was minister at the Congregational Church in Duke Street.
Stuart Lancaster (born 1969) became head coach of the England national rugby union.
Paul Nixon (born 1970), Leicestershire wicket-keeper and England cricket international, was born in Carlisle, but grew up in the Penrith area. Nixon retired from professional sport in 2011.
Angela Lonsdale (born 1970 in Penrith), actress, is perhaps best known as policewoman Emma Taylor in Coronation Street and currently stars as DI Eva Moore in the BBC soap Doctors.
Charlie Hunnam (born 1980), the actor, attended Queen Elizabeth Grammar School, Penrith (QEGS) and lived locally in his teenage years. He claimed it is "just about the worst place you could hope to live".
Lewis Brett Guy (born 1985 in Penrith) is an English football forward currently with Annan Athletic F.C.
Danny Grainger (born 1986), footballer, scored Heart of Midlothian's third goal in the 2012 Scottish Cup final against Hibernian.
Oliver Turvey (born 1987), racing driver, attended Queen Elizabeth Grammar School and lives locally.
Stephen Hindmarch (born 1989), a professional footballer, was born here.

Night life
Like other rural towns of its size, Penrith relies on public houses to form the basis of social entertainment. It was once famous for the sheer number of its pubs, served by five working breweries. The trend of pub closures continues, but many remain. They range from small traditional pubs with a loyal clientele to bigger bars that form part of the "circuit". Penrith also has numerous dining places and restaurants.

The Lonsdale (formerly the Alhambra) in Middlegate is a cinema with three screens built in 1910 by William Forrester. There was until the 1980s another cinema called the Regent on Old London Road.

Amateur dramatics and musicals are staged at the Penrith Players Theatre, Ullswater Community College and Queen Elizabeth Grammar School.

Penrith dialect
The Penrith dialect known as Penrithian, spoken around the Penrith and Eden district area, is a variant of the Cumbrian dialect.

Media
The local newspaper, the Cumberland and Westmorland Herald appears on Saturdays. Sections are updated every following Tuesday on their website. It is independently owned, with offices on King Street, but printed at the Newsquest's printing works in Glasgow, along with the weekly Cumberland News and daily News and Star which also cover some news items from Penrith. A separate edition of the Herald is published for the Keswick area, known as the Lake District Herald.

Penrith lies with the ITV Border region and the BBC North East and Cumbria. There are three local radio stations serving the Penrith area. Eden FM which is based in Penrith and two others based in Carlisle. These are BBC Radio Cumbria and the independent station CFM.

Penrith was used as a setting in the 1940 book Cue for Treason by Geoffrey Trease. It was also a setting for Bruce Robinson's 1987 film Withnail and I, although the Penrith scenes were actually filmed in Stony Stratford, Buckinghamshire.

Education

Uniformed youth organisations
Penrith hosts two Community Cadet Forces units: 1247 Squadron of the Air Training Corps and Penrith Detachment of Cumbria Army Cadet Force.

Primary schools
Brunswick School (formerly County Infants), Brunswick Road
Beaconside Primary, Eden Mount/Brent Road. Until 2008 there were separate Beaconside Infant and Junior schools.
North Lakes School (formerly Wetheriggs Junior; was at first a girls-only school), Huntley Avenue – North Lakes was one of the first schools in England to be awarded a Sing Up Gold Award (in December 2008) and their highest accolade, a Sing Up Platinum Award (likewise in December 2008).
St Catherines Roman Catholic Primary, Drovers Lane
Hunter Hall (private preparatory school), Frenchfield

Secondary schools
Ullswater Community College (formerly Ullswater High School, and before that, two single sex secondary modern schools on the same site called Tynefield (girls) and Ullswater (boys)), Wetheriggs Lane
Queen Elizabeth Grammar School (QEGS) (selective), Ullswater Road

Further education
The former Newton Rigg College had its campus just outside the town. Its most recent owner was Askham Bryan College but in the past it has been part of UCLAN and subsequently the University of Cumbria. Since the closure some facilities remain available for public and educational use, for example the Equestrian Centre re-opened in February 2022
Ullswater Community College had a large further or adult education centre.

Former schools in the town include:
Girls National School (building now housing school replaced by Beaconside Juniors), Drovers Lane
Boys National School or St Andrews School for Boys (building now demolished school replaced by Beaconside Juniors), Benson Row
National Infants School (now Penrith Playgroup Nursery School), Meeting House Lane
Robinsons School – this was a girls-only school founded with 29 pupils, which later became a mixed (infant) school founded in 1670 by William Robinson, a local merchant who made good in London. It now houses the town's museum and tourist information centre, Middlegate, and has the following inscription above the door: ""
County Girls School (building now part of Brunswick Infants, the school was replaced by Wetheriggs), Brunswick Road
County Boys School (the building now QEGS Sixth Form Centre, also for a while an annexe to Wetheriggs). The school merged with Wetheriggs Girls to form Wetheriggs Junior, Ullswater Road
Tynefield Secondary Modern (originally co-educational but later girls only), Wetheriggs Lane
Ullswater Secondary Modern (boys only), Wetheriggs Lane. Ullswater and Tynefield schools and buildings merged to create Ullswater High in 1980.

Places of worship

Churches

St Andrew's Church is the ancient parish church of Penrith Parish, sited in the centre of Penrith. It is the largest of four parishes making up the Penrith Team Ministry.
Christ Church, Drovers Lane/Stricklandgate, opened in 1850 as a separate parish, but from 1968 to 2008 was part of the United Parish of Penrith. It is now again a separate parish church for the northern part of the town, remaining within the Penrith Team Ministry.

Roman Catholic Church
St Catherine's, Drovers Lane

Methodist Church of Great Britain
Penrith Methodist Church, Wordsworth Street

Other churches
United Reformed Church, Lowther Street
Society of Friends, Quaker Meeting House, Meeting House Lane
Gospel Hall Evangelical Church, Albert Street/Queen Street
King's Church Eden - part of the Newfrontiers family of churches
Oasis Evangelical Church, Brackenber Court, Musgrave Street
Salvation Army, Hunter Lane
Church in the Barn, Castietown Community Centre, Gilwilly
Influence Church Assemblies of God, Burrowgate

Mosques
The town also has two places of worship for Islam. It has an Islamic centre called the "Quba Islamic Centre" and a mosque called the "Al-Amin Mosque". Both are close to each other and on both Middlegate and Bluebell Lane.

Economy

As a market town relying heavily on the tourist trade, Penrith benefits from some high-street chain stores and local specialist shops alongside other businesses such as banks, building societies and travel agents.

Market days are traditionally Tuesday and Saturday. On Tuesdays there was a small outdoor market in Great Dockray and Cornmarket. This ceased in the early 21st century, since when a small farmers' market has been held in the Market Square once a month. On Saturdays, Cumbria's largest outdoor market takes place at the Auction Mart alongside the M6 motorway junction 40.

The main central shopping areas are Middlegate, Little Dockray, Devonshire Street/Market Square, Cornmarket, King Street, Angel Lane and the Devonshire Arcade and Angel Square precincts, with some shops in Burrowgate, Brunswick Road and Great Dockray.

Although the main industries are based around tourism and agriculture, some others are represented. For example, in 2011 Greggs opened a new bakery at Gilwilly, replacing two bakeries in the Friargate area that used to belong to the Penrith-based Birketts firm. Domino's Pizza had a dough manufacturing site at Gilwilly until 2019. The model firm Lilliput Lane (now part of Enesco) was founded in Penrith and until March 2009 had its main factory at Skirsgill Park. Also at Penrith Industrial Estate is the Penrith Door Company factory, formerly part of Magnet Joinery, now of the American-based JELD-WEN group.

Agriculture-based industries include BOCM Pauls, which has a large animal feed mill on the Penrith Industrial Estate. Until 2005 there was another feed mill at Gilwilly, originally belonging to Cumberland and Westmorland Farmers Ltd, but eventually becoming part of the Carrs Milling Industries group. Local butchers Cranstons have an expanding meat packing, pie and sandwich-manufacturing site alongside their shop and head office on Ullswater Road.

Penrith was known for its tanning industry and breweries. The tanneries were mainly in the Friargate/Old London Road area of the town. There were at one time five working breweries. Penrith in recent years has attracted many larger international haulage firms to open depots beside the M6.

Fylde Guitars is a manufacturer of hand-made fretted musical instruments, founded in Penrith in 1973 by luthier Roger Bucknall. Its instruments command high prices. All are hand-made using traditional techniques and have been developed in collaboration with professional players. Fylde Guitars is the only UK guitar maker to have been awarded the Acoustic Guitar Magazine "Gold Award", in 2000.

Sport
Penrith is home to Penrith Rugby Union Football Club, which currently plays in the RFU National League 3 North. Home games are played at Winters Park in Penrith.

Penrith Netball Club has been active in the town since 2002. They cater for junior players from the age of 11, as well as adults, playing at both secondary schools (QEGS and Ullswater Community College) in the town. Penrith Netball are currently playing in the Carlisle Netball League.

Penrith A.F.C. plays in the Northern Football League.

There is a skate park area by the Penrith Leisure Centre. The skate park opened in 2007.

Penrith has a golf club and driving range. Penrith Castle Park houses the town's Bowling Club.

Penrith Swimming Club was founded in 1881 and was then based at Frenchfield in the River Eamont. Training sessions originally involved great variations of conditions that challenged the skills of any swimmer. Icy water, strong currents and obstacles like weed and the odd eel or two provided the ultimate test of stamina. It was all a far cry from conditions for today's training sessions, held at Penrith Leisure Centre.

Penrith Canoe Club, founded in 2012, trains at the local leisure centre. Its main activity is canoe polo, in which the club was represented at the World Championships in Syracuse, Italy 2016 by its under-21 women's squad, which finished a respectable fourth.

Penrith Tennis Club is located in the grounds of Penrith Rugby Club at Carleton Village.

Twin town
Since 1989 Penrith has had a twinning arrangement with the Australian city named after it in New South Wales.

Regular events
Mayday Carnival On the first Monday in May, Penrith holds a Mayday Carnival run by Penrith Lions Club. It includes a parade, street dancers and fairground rides in the Great Dockray and Market Square car parks of the commercial area. The procession includes floats, vintage cars and tractors, a marching band, various local celebrities and members of the Penrith Lions Club. It starts in the yard of Ullswater Community College and ends in the bus station car park. Many roads in the centre are closed for the event.

Penrith Agricultural Show The first Penrith Show was held in 1834. From 2019 the event takes place on the 3rd Saturday in July.

The Winter Droving Held in late October/early November 'The Winter Droving Festival' celebrates all things rural, traditional and fun. The highlight is a torch-lit procession through the town, featuring fire, lanterns, masquerade and music and mayhem. The event is a celebration of Penrith and its age-old role as the market place for the local area, where for centuries livestock and produce has been brought for sale.

Kendal Calling Music Festival held in late July each year at Lowther Deer Park has had headline acts that included the Stereophonics, Tinie Tempah, Editors and the Manic Street Preachers.

Potfest Ceramic Festivals takes place as Potfest in the Pens and Potfest in the Park at Skirsgill Auction Mart and Hutton in the Forest.

Lowther Show Held at nearby Lowther Castle each August, this includes the Lowther Horse Driving Trials as attended in the past by Prince Philip.

Climate
Like most of the British Isles, Penrith has a maritime climate with mild summers and winters. The nearest Met Office weather station is at Newton Rigg, about a mile outside of the centre. Newton Rigg also holds a record for the coldest April temperature reported in England:  in April 1917.

See also

Listed buildings in Penrith, Cumbria
Cockermouth, Keswick and Penrith Railway
Penrith and The Border (UK Parliament constituency)
Penrith Mountain Rescue Team
Penrith Hoard

References

Sources

.

External links

Cumbria County History Trust: Penrith (nb: provisional research only - see Talk page)
Penrith Leisure Centre
Area profile based on 2001 census Details

Penrith
Market towns in Cumbria
Cumberland
Towns in Cumbria
Eden District
Civil parishes in Cumbria